Alan Shepard (born ) is a Canadian academic and the current and 11th president and vice-chancellor of Western University in London, Ontario, effective July 2019. He previously served as the president and vice-chancellor of Concordia University in Montreal.

Early life and education 
Shepard was born in Iowa, and is a dual citizen of both Canada and the United States. He has a background in Early Modern English literature. He received an BA in English literature from St. Olaf College in 1983 and received a PhD in English from the University of Virginia in 1990.

Career 
Shepard served as the chair of the English department at Texas Christian University from 1998 to 2002. He moved to Canada in 2002, where he began working as a visiting research fellow at the University of Toronto.

Shepard was hired as an associate vice-president academic at University of Guelph in 2005. In 2007, Shepard became the provost and vice-president academic at Ryerson University, where he worked until 2012. At Ryerson, Shepard led the development of a business incubator called the Digital Media Zone.

In August 2012, Shepard became the president and vice-chancellor of Concordia University in Montreal. His two predecessors, Judith Woodsworth and Claude Lajeunesse, were both removed midway through their terms due to scandals.

In November 2018, Shepard announced he would be leaving Concordia on 30 June 2019 to become the president and vice-chancellor of Western University in London, Ontario. In July 2019, Shepard replaced Amit Chakma to become the 11th president of Western. In December 2022 he was reappointed to a second term as President.

Shepard has served on the board of directors at Universities Canada, Stratford Festival, and the Chamber of Commerce of Metropolitan Montreal. He is currently chair of the Canadian Research Knowledge Network.

Personal life 
Shepard has two children with his husband Stephen Powell, an associate professor at Concordia University.

On 31 December 2021 Shepard took a leave of absence from the Presidency of Western after an unexpected heart attack. After consultation with the Board of Governors, President Shepard entrusted his authority to Dr. Sarah Prichard, the university's provost and vice-president academic, for a period of at least 30 days.

References

External links 
Biography at Western University
Biography at Concordia University

Living people
Canadian people of American descent
St. Olaf College alumni
University of Virginia alumni
Texas Christian University faculty
Academic staff of the University of Toronto
Academic staff of the University of Guelph
Academic staff of Concordia University
Academic staff of Toronto Metropolitan University
Year of birth missing (living people)
Presidents of the University of Western Ontario
21st-century Canadian LGBT people
Canadian LGBT academics